This is a list of amphibious warfare ships of the Royal Fleet Auxiliary of the United Kingdom.

Active
Bay class
RFA Mounts Bay
RFA Cardigan Bay
RFA Lyme Bay

Decommissioned

Bay class
RFA Largs Bay
 Round Table class
 RFA Sir Lancelot
 RFA Sir Galahad (i)
 RFA Sir Geraint
 RFA Sir Percivale
 RFA Sir Tristram
 RFA Sir Galahad (ii)
 RFA Sir Bedivere
 Chartered LSL
 RFA Sir Caradoc
 RFA Sir Lamorak
 Chartered Ro/Ro
 RFA Sea Centurion
 RFA Sea Crusader
 Landing Ship Tank
 RFA Empire Gull
 Landing Ship Gantry
 RFA Derwentdale
 RFA Dewdale
 RFA Ennerdale

 
Royal Fleet Auxiliary
Amphibious